Como si fuera la primera vez is a 2019 Mexican comedy film directed by Mauricio T. Valle. It is a remake of the 2004 film 50 First Dates, directed by Peter Segal, and starring Adam Sandler, and Drew Barrymore. The remake stars Vadhir Derbez, and Ximena Romo as the main protagonists of the story. The film, like the original version, retained its title translated into Spanish in Latin America. The film premiered on 30 August 2019 in Mexico.

Cast 
 Vadhir Derbez as Diego
 Ximena Romo as Luci
 Francisco Rueda
 Alejandro Camacho

References 

Remakes of American films
Mexican comedy films
2019 comedy films
2010s Mexican films